The year 1962 was the 181st year of the Rattanakosin Kingdom of Thailand. It was the 17th year in the reign of King Bhumibol Adulyadej (Rama IX), and is reckoned as year 2505 in the Buddhist Era.

Incumbents
King: Bhumibol Adulyadej 
Crown Prince: (vacant)
Prime Minister: Sarit Thanarat 
Supreme Patriarch: 
until 17 June Ariyavongsagatanana III

 

 
Years of the 20th century in Thailand
Thailand
Thailand
1960s in Thailand